SRT (Street & Racing Technology) is an American high-performance automobile group within Dodge and the wider Stellantis North America organization. In addition to Dodge models, SRT has tuned and produced cars for Chrysler and Jeep.

Origins of the brand date back to 1989 when a team known as "Team Viper" was organized to develop the Dodge Viper. It later merged with Team Prowler, the developers of the Plymouth Prowler, to become Specialty Vehicle Engineering (SVE). This was renamed Performance Vehicle Operations (PVO) from January 2002 until around 2004. Since all PVO vehicles used the SRT brand, the development team itself was renamed SRT in 2004. SRT tuned and produced vehicles for the Chrysler, Dodge, and Jeep brands, including police models for Chrysler/FCA Fleet Division.

Cars 

The naming convention used by SRT for its models is indicative of the vehicle's engine type. The number that follows the "SRT" prefix denotes the number of engine cylinders. For example, Chrysler 300C models with 6.1 L Hemi V8s when in the SRT version are named as the Chrysler 300C SRT-8. Similarly, the Dodge Viper SRT-10 along with the Dodge Ram SRT-10 had an 8.3 L V10.

Currently, the fastest SRT production models are the 2018 Dodge Challenger Demon with a quarter-mile time of 9.65 seconds, the 2021 Dodge Challenger SRT Super Stock with a quarter-mile time of 10.5 seconds, the 2021 Dodge Charger SRT Hellcat RedEye with a quarter-mile time of 10.6 seconds, the 2015 Dodge Charger Hellcat with a quarter-mile time of 11.0 seconds, the 2013 Dodge Viper with a quarter-mile time of 11.1 seconds, the 2015 Challenger Hellcat with a quarter-mile time of 11.2 seconds, the Dodge Durango SRT Hellcat with a quarter-mile time of 11.5 seconds, the Jeep Grand Cherokee Trackhawk with a quarter-mile time of 11.5, and the Dodge Challenger R/T Scat Pack 1320 with a quarter-mile time of 11.7 seconds. Other SRT models have recorded quarter-mile performances, from 12.8 seconds for the AMG-based Chrysler Crossfire SRT-6 to the Dodge Neon SRT-4 at 13.9 seconds.

The new engine is used in the 2012 Dodge Challenger SRT8, Dodge Charger SRT8, Chrysler 300 SRT8, and the Jeep Grand Cherokee SRT8. With the improved engine, the current SRT8 model is not only faster than the previous model but also has better fuel efficiency than the previous one.

In 2012 Chrysler implemented a plan to turn SRT into a separate brand under the Chrysler Group umbrella. During the 2013 and 2014 model years, the Dodge Viper was sold under the model name SRT Viper. In May 2014, the SRT brand was re-consolidated under Dodge, with former SRT CEO Ralph Gilles continuing as senior vice president of product design and also as the CEO and president of Motorsports.

The Jeep Grand Cherokee SRT-8 is being sold in China by dealer import methods. Due to increasing interest in American muscle cars, dealers were considering also importing the Dodge Charger and Challenger SRT-8 into China. However, little to none of the Charger and Challenger imports to China have been confirmed.

After two years of SRT as an independent division, Fiat Chrysler Automobiles (now Stellantis)  announced on May 4, 2014, that the SRT family of vehicles will be consolidated under the Dodge brand. This includes renaming the "SRT Viper" back again to the legendary "Dodge Viper". This will expand the Dodge lineup to focus on it as a performance-dedicated brand.

In late 2014, Chrysler announced a new variant of the Dodge Challenger and Charger models named "SRT Hellcat" and another variant called the "SRT Demon" in early 2017.

Current vehicles 

The current lineup from SRT are the Chrysler 300 SRT, Dodge Challenger SRT 392, Dodge Challenger SRT Hellcat, Dodge Challenger SRT Demon, Dodge Charger SRT 392, Dodge Charger SRT Hellcat, Dodge Charger Pursuit, Dodge Durango SRT 392, Dodge Durango Pursuit, Dodge Durango SRT Hellcat, Jeep Grand Cherokee SRT and Jeep Grand Cherokee Trackhawk. As for the Chrysler 300 SRT, the car is only sold in Australia, New Zealand, and the Middle East, whereas the US version has been discontinued.

Previous vehicles

Manufacturer engines 

SRT has made six engines so far, and one derived engine. Their first two engines were the third generation ZB I's 8.3 L naturally aspirated Viper V10 and the Neon SRT-4's 2.4 L turbocharged I4.

4-cylinder engines 

SRT's 2.4 L turbocharged I4 for the Neon SRT-4 had produced  in 2003 and  later in 2004 and 2005. Another 2.4 L I4 was made, but this time was based on the Chrysler World Engine, and was made for the Caliber SRT-4.

6-cylinder engines 

The Crossfire SRT-6 never had a SRT-made engine, instead sourcing the M112k engines from Mercedes-Benz, (used in the Mercedes C32 AMG and SLK32 AMG), which produced .

8-cylinder engines 

SRT has built four V8s, which it has applied to five vehicles: Chrysler 300, Dodge Challenger, Dodge Charger, Dodge Magnum, and Jeep Grand Cherokee. Their first V8 was a 6.1 L naturally aspirated Hemi V8 engine that made . However, the Jeep Grand Cherokee SRT-8 only had . Their second unit is a 6.4 L naturally aspirated Apache V8 engine that originally made  but was upgraded to produce  after 2014. SRT's most powerful variant is a 6.2 L supercharged V8, with two separate units used on the Hellcat and Demon models. The Hellcat's version makes  and the Demon's makes . On 100-octane fuel, though, the Demon's engine makes .

10-cylinder engines 

SRT's 10-cylinder engines have only been used in two models, the Viper and the Ram 1500 SRT-10. The first versions, the 8.3 L naturally aspirated Viper V10 produced . The last generation Viper used a brand new engine, but still kept the 8.4 L displacement. The engine produced , which then increased to  after the Dodge-SRT absorption.

See also
 Dodge R/T Vehicles
 Chrysler Hemi engine

References

External links

 
 Drive SRT (archived, 15 Aug 2011)

Dodge
Official motorsports and performance division of automakers
American Le Mans Series teams
American auto racing teams
WeatherTech SportsCar Championship teams
24 Hours of Le Mans teams
Auto tuning companies
Automotive motorsports and performance companies
Sports car manufacturers
Car manufacturers of the United States